Condé Nast is a global mass media company founded in 1909 by Condé Montrose Nast (1873–1942), and owned by Advance Publications. Its headquarters are located at One World Trade Center in the Financial District of Lower Manhattan.

The company's media brands attract more than 72 million consumers in print, 394 million in digital and 454 million across social platforms. These include Vogue, The New Yorker, Condé Nast Traveler, GQ, Glamour, Architectural Digest, Vanity Fair, Pitchfork, Wired, and Bon Appétit, among many others. US Vogue editor-in-chief Anna Wintour serves as Artistic Director and Global Chief Content Officer. In 2011, the company launched the Condé Nast Entertainment division, tasked with developing film, television, social and digital video, and virtual reality content.

History

The company traces its roots to 1909, when Condé Montrose Nast, a New York City-born publisher, purchased Vogue, a printed magazine launched in 1892 as a New York weekly journal of society and fashion news.

Nast initially published the magazine under the corporate name Vogue Company. In 1922, he incorporated Condé Nast Publications as the holding company for his interests. Nast had a flair for nurturing elite readers as well as advertisers and upgraded Vogue, sending the magazine on its path of becoming a top haute couture fashion authority. Eventually, Nast's portfolio expanded to include House & Garden, Vanity Fair (briefly known as Dress and Vanity Fair), Glamour, and American Golfer, published from 1908–1920. The company also introduced British Vogue in 1916, and Condé Nast became the first publisher of an overseas edition of an existing magazine.

Condé Nast is largely considered to be the originator of the "class publication", a type of magazine focused on a particular social group or interest instead of targeting the largest possible readership. Its magazines focus on a wide range of subjects, including travel, food, home, and culture, with fashion the larger portion of the company's focus.

Nast opened a printing facility in Old Greenwich, Connecticut in 1924 but closed in 1964 to make way for more centrally located sites capable of producing higher volumes. During the Great Depression, Condé Nast introduced innovative typography, design, and color. Vogue's first full color photograph by Edward Steichen was featured on the cover in 1932, marking the year when Condé Nast began replacing fashion drawings on covers with photo illustrations―an innovative move at the time. Glamour, launched in 1939, was the last magazine personally introduced to the company by Nast, who died in 1942.

In 1959, Samuel I. Newhouse bought Condé Nast for US$5 million as an anniversary gift for his wife Mitzi, who loved Vogue. He merged it with the privately held holding company Advance Publications. His son, S. I. Newhouse, Jr., known as "Si," became chairman of Condé Nast in 1975.

Under Newhouse, Condé Nast acquired Brides in 1959, revived Vanity Fair in 1983 after it was shuttered in 1936, and launched the new publication Self in 1979.

2000–2009
At the outset of the new millennium in January 2000, Condé Nast moved from 350 Madison Avenue to 4 Times Square. The move was viewed as a significant catalyst for the gentrification of Times Square. In the same year, Condé Nast purchased Fairchild Publications (now known as Fairchild Fashion Media), home to W and WWD, from the Walt Disney Company. In 2001, Condé Nast bought Golf Digest and Golf World from The New York Times Company for US$435 million. On October 31, 2006, Condé Nast acquired the content aggregation site Reddit, later on spun off as a wholly owned subsidiary of Condé Nast in September 2011.

The company folded the women's magazine Jane with its August issue in 2007, and later shut down its website. One of Condé Nast's oldest titles, the American edition of House and Garden, ceased publication after the December 2007 issue. Portfolio, Mademoiselle and Domino were folded as well. On May 20, 2008, the company announced its acquisition of a popular technology-oriented website, Ars Technica.

On October 5, 2009, Condé Nast announced the closure of three of its publications: Cookie, Modern Bride, and Elegant Bride. Gourmet ceased monthly publication with its November 2009 issue; the Gourmet brand was later resurrected as "Gourmet Live", an iPad app that delivers new editorial content in the form of recipes, interviews, stories, and videos. In print, Gourmet continues in the form of special editions on newsstands and cookbooks.

On February 18, 2009 Condé Nast announced the launch of Love magazine, a bi-annual British style magazine founded by fashion journalist Katie Grand. In 2020, Grand announced her departure and was replaced by Whembley Sewell.

2010–2020
In July 2010, Robert Sauerberg became Condé Nast's president. In May 2011, the company was the first major publisher to deliver subscriptions for the iPad, starting with The New Yorker; the company has since rolled out iPad subscriptions for nine of its titles. In the same month, Next Issue Media, a joint venture formed by five U.S. publishers including Condé Nast, announced subscriptions for Android devices, initially available for the Samsung Galaxy Tab.

In September 2011, Condé Nast said it would offer 17 of its brands to the Kindle Fire. The company launched Conde Nast Entertainment in 2011 to develop film, television, and digital video programming. In May 2013, CNÉ's Digital Video Network debuted, featuring web series for such publications as Glamour and GQ. Wired joined the Digital Video Network with the announcement of five original web series including the National Security Agency satire Codefellas and the animated advice series Mister Know-It-All.

In October 2013, the company ended its internship program after being sued by two former interns claiming they had been paid less than minimum wage for summer internships there. In November 2014, the company moved into One World Trade Center in Manhattan, where its headquarters are now located. On September 14, 2015, the company announced Sauerberg as its new CEO, with former CEO Charles H. Townsend taking the role of Chairman, and S. I. Newhouse Jr. taking the role of Chairman Emeritus in January 2016. On October 13, 2015, Condé Nast announced that it had acquired Pitchfork.

In July 2016, the company announced the launch of Condé Nast Spire, a new division of the company focusing on consumer purchasing data and content consumption through the company's own first-party behavioral data. The Chairman of the company, Charles Townsend, retired at the end of 2016, and the Chairman Emeritus Newhouse died the following October.

In March 2018, Condé Nast announced the launch of the influencer-based platform Next Gen. The company's Chief Revenue and Marketing Officer, Pamela Drucker Mann, stated that the platform would feature both "in-house and external talent with significant and meaningful social followings". In April 2019, Condé Nast appointed the former CEO of Pandora Media, Roger Lynch, as the company's first global CEO. It also sold the magazine Brides to the digital media company Dotdash, and in May of the same year, announced the sale of Golf Digest to Discovery, Inc. In June of the same year, Condé Nast sold W to a new holding company, Future Media Group. W editor Stefano Tonchi later sued the company for wrongful termination, with Condé Nast suing Tonchi in response, seeking the return of "all monies paid to [Tonchi] during his period of disloyalty", claiming that he had acted as a "faithless servant" during the sale of W, and had interfered with the sale to benefit himself.

Roger Lynch was appointed chief executive officer in April 2019, and in October 2019, announced plans to increase Condé Nast's revenue from readers.

In June 2020, following the global outbreak of the coronavirus COVID-19, it was reported that Condé Nast had experienced a drop in advertising revenues of 45% as a result of the pandemic. It was also reported that the company had, in previous years, sublet six of the company's 23 floors in the One World Trade Center, following the cancellation of a number of its publishing titles.

Current US publications and digital assets

Print

 Architectural Digest
 Bon Appétit
 Condé Nast Traveler
 GQ
 The New Yorker
 Vanity Fair
 Vogue
 Wired

Digital

 Allure
 Ars Technica
 Backchannel
 Epicurious
 Glamour
 Pitchfork
 Reddit
 them.
 Teen Vogue
 Self
 Love
 La Cucina Italiana

Defunct publications

Mergers and acquisitions

Acquisitions

Stakes

See also
 Condé Nast union
 Genwi (2011) launch of Condé Nast's "The Daily W" app

Notes

References

External links

 Condé Nast homepage
 Condé Nast Middle East homepage

 
Fashion journalism
Publishing companies based in New York City
Mass media companies established in 1909
Publishing companies established in 1909
1909 establishments in New York City
Advance Publications
Bon Appétit